The following is a list of works about Boston, Massachusetts, USA.:

Nonfiction

General

Bibliographies

Directories
 Boston Directory

Guides

History

List of works, arranged by author
 Beatty, Jack. The Rascal King: The Life and Times of James Michael Curley, 1874-1958 (1992) 
 Blake, John B. Public Health in the Town of Boston, 1630-1822 (Harvard UP, 1959).
 Bridenbaugh, Carl. Cities in the Wilderness-The First Century of Urban Life in America 1625-1742 (1938) 
 Bridenbaugh, Carl.  Cities in Revolt: Urban Life in America, 1743-1776 (1955)
 Carp, Benjamin L. Defiance of the Patriots: The Boston Tea Party and the Making of America (2010)
 Connolly, James J. The Triumph of Ethnic Progressivism: urban political culture in Boston, 1900-1925 (2009).
 Conzen, Michael P., and George King Lewis, eds. Boston: A geographical portrait (1976)
 Fischer, David Hackett. Paul Revere's Ride (Oxford UP, 1994)
 Eisinger, Peter K. "Ethnic political transition in Boston, 1884-1933: Some lessons for contemporary cities." Political Science Quarterly (1978): 217-239. in JSTOR
 Formisano, Ronald P., Constance K. Burns, eds. Boston, 1700-1980: The Evolution of Urban Politics (Greenwood Press, 1984), the standard political history
 Gamm, Gerald H. The making of the New Deal Democrats: Voting behavior and realignment in Boston, 1920-1940 (University of Chicago Press, 1989).

 Handlin, Oscar. Boston's Immigrants: A Study in Acculturation (1941)
 
 Kane, Paula M. Separatism and Subculture: Boston Catholicism, 1900-1920 (2001) 
 McCaughey, Robert A. Josiah Quincy 1772-1864: The Last Federalist (Harvard UP, 1974)
 Miller, John C. Sam Adams, Pioneer in Propaganda (1936)
 O'Connor, Thomas H. The Boston Irish: A Political History (1995)
 O'Toole, James M. Militant and Triumphant: William Henry O'Connell and the Catholic Church in Boston, 1859-1944 (1992)
 Russell, Francis. A City in Terror--1919--: The Boston Police Strike (1975).
 Rutman, Darrett B. Winthrop's Boston: Portrait of a Puritan Town, 1630-1649 (U of North Carolina Press, 1965).
 Sammarco, Anthony Mitchell; Price, Michael, Boston's immigrants, 1840-1925, Arcadia Publishing, Images of America series, 2000
 
 Sammarco, Anthony Mitchell, The Great Boston Fire of 1872, Arcadia Publishing, Images of America series, 1997
 Sammarco, Anthony Mitchell, Lost Boston, Pavilion Press, May 1, 2014. 
 
 Trout, Charles H. Boston, the Great Depression, and the New Deal (1977) online

Ulrich, Laurel Thatcher, Big Dig, Little Dig, Hidden Worlds: Boston, Common-Place, American Antiquarian Society, v.3, n.4, July 2003
 Vale, Lawrence J., "From the Puritans to the Projects: Public Housing and Public Neighbors" (Cambridge, Mass.: Harvard Press, 2000).
 
 Warden, Gerard B. Boston, 1689-1776 (1970), the standard history for the period
 Warner, Sam Bass. Streetcar Suburbs: The Process of Growth in Boston, 1870-1900 (2nd ed. 1978)
 Waters, John J. The Otis Family in Provincial and Revolutionary Massachusetts (1968)
 Whitehill, Walter Muir. Boston: A Topographical History, (2nd ed. Harvard UP, 1968), on geography and neighborhoods

List of works, arranged chronologically

Published in the 18th century

Published in the 19th century
1800s-1840s
 
 
 
 

1850s-1890s
 
 
 
 
 v.1: Early and Colonial Periods	
 v.2: Provincial Period
 v.3: Revolutionary Period. The Last Hundred Years, Pt.1	
 v.4: Last Hundred Years, Pt.2. Special topics
 
 Bacon, Edwin Munroe, and Edward, George, "Ellis Bacon's Dictionary of Boston", Houghton, Mifflin and company, 1886.

Published in the 20th century
1900s-1940s
 
 
 

 
 
 
 
 Hartnell, Edward Mussey; McGlenen, Edward Webster; Skelton, Edward Oliver, Boston and its story, 1630-1915, City of Boston (Mass.), Printing Department, 1916.

 
 
 
 

1950s-1970s
 
 
 
 Henretta, J.A. (1965) "Economic Development and Social Structure in Colonial Boston", The William and Mary Quarterly 22(1): 75-92.
 
 Ward, D. (1966) "The Industrial Revolution and the Emergence of Boston's Central Business District", Economic Geography 42 (2): 152-171.
 
  (includes essays about Boston)
 
 
 
 

 

1980s-1990s
 
 
 
 
 
 
 
  (fulltext via Open Library)

Published in the 21st century 
 Thomas H. O'Connor, Boston, A to Z (Cambridge: Harvard University Press, 2000)
 

 Tager, Jack. (2001) Boston Riots: Three Centuries of Social Violence (Upne, 2001).
 Matos Rodrííguez, Féélix V. (2001) "'The Browncoats are Coming': Latino Public History in Boston." Public Historian 23.4 (2001): 15-28.
 Bjarkman, Peter C. (2002) Boston Celtics Encyclopedia (Sports Publishing LLC, 2002).

 
 
 

 Rawson, Michael. (2004) "The nature of water: reform and the antebellum crusade for municipal water in Boston." Environmental history 9.3 (2004): 411-435.
 Dolin, Eric Jay. (2004) Political waters: the long, dirty, contentious, incredibly expensive but eventually triumphant history of Boston Harbor, a unique environmental success story (University of Massachusetts Press, 2004).
 Minardi, Margot. (2004) "The Boston inoculation controversy of 1721-1722: an incident in the history of race." William and Mary Quarterly 61.1 (2004): 47-76. online
 
 
 Carr, Jacqueline Barbara. (2005) After the Siege: A Social History of Boston 1775-1800. Upne, 2005.
 

 Kaufman, Polly Welts, et al. (2006) Boston Women's Heritage Trail: Seven Self-guided Walking Tours Through Four Centuries of Boston Women's History (Applewood Books, 2006).
 Nathan, Gavin. (2006) Historic Taverns of Boston: 370 Years of Tavern History in One Definitive Guide (iUniverse, 2006).
 Kay, Jane Holtz. (2006) Lost Boston (Univ of Massachusetts Press, 2006), destroed buildings.
 Puleo, Stephen. (2007) The Boston Italians: A Story of Pride, Perseverance, and Paesani, from the Years of the Great Immigration to the Present Day (Beacon Press, 2007).

 Gelber, Scott. (2008) "'The crux and the magic': The Political History of Boston Magnet Schools, 1968–1989." Equity & Excellence in Education 41.4 (2008): 453-466.
 Wolff, Katherine. (2009) Culture club: The curious history of the Boston Athenaeum (University of Massachusetts Press, 2009).
 
 York, Neil L. (2010) The Boston Massacre: A History with Documents (Routledge, 2010).

 Johnson, Arthur M., and Barry E. Supple. (2013) Boston Capitalists and Western Railroads (Harvard University Press, 2013).
 Whitehill, Walter Muir. (2013) Boston Public Library (Harvard University Press, 2013).
 Holmes, Pauline. (2013) A Tercentenary History of the Boston Public Latin School, 1635–1935 (Harvard University Press, 2013).
 

 Bagley, Joseph M. (2016) A history of Boston in 50 artifacts (University Press of New England, 2016).
 
 

 Levesque, George A. (2018) Black Boston: African American life and culture in urban America, 1750–1860 (Routledge, 2018).

Fiction

See also
 Media in Boston
 Boston Book Festival
 List of booksellers in Boston

External links
 
Catalogs
 Boston Public Library. Online catalog: subject:(boston)
 Bostonian Society. Online Catalog 
 Digital Public Library of America. Items related to Boston, various dates
 Europeana. Items related to Boston, Massachusetts, various dates.
 Massachusetts Historical Society. Online library catalog
 WorldCat. su:Boston (Mass.)

Boston
Boston-related lists
boston
boston